Midwest Music Summit is an annual music festival held in Indianapolis, Indiana which showcases musicians from the Midwest. The festival also includes music business seminars, covering topics such as A&R, promotion, artist development and copyright issues. The festival was created in 2001 by Indianapolis natives Josh Baker, Kevin Ahern, and Jason Beatty.

2001
In its first year, the festival featured 100 bands.

2005
2005 marked a unique year for Midwest Music Summit, as it took over Indianapolis along with NAMM summer session. The festival took place July 22–24 and featured over 250 bands. The festival was attended by over 16,000 people.

2006
The festival took place August 10–12 and featured 342 bands on 20 stages. Unlike 2005, the festival only took place in Broad Ripple venues, with no events downtown. The lineup was diverse, with rock, hip-hop, country, and indie rock bands performing. It also featured more nationally recognized acts than in previous years.

2006 lineup highlights:

 Dr. Octagon (aka Kool Keith)
 Silversun Pickups
 Local H
 Margot & The Nuclear So and So's
 Bel Auburn
 Mickey Avalon
 Murder by Death
 Russian Circles
 The Elms
 The Sun
 Virgin Millionaires
 Man in Gray
 Cities
 Need To Breathe
 Page France
 Office
 The Reverend Peyton's Big Damn Band
 Dave Golden
 Aberdeen City
 Shock G (from Digital Underground)
 Those Young Lions
 Mudkids
 Pravada
 Everthus the Deadbeats
 Everything, Now!
 Wheatus

2007
According to a statement posted on the Internet on April 12, 2007, Midwest Music Summit will not take place in 2007, but will return in 2008.

2008
The Summit took place August 7–9, 2008.

References

External links
 

Music festivals in Ohio
Festivals in Indianapolis
Music conferences
Festivals established in 2001
2001 establishments in Ohio